Griffith is a surname of Welsh origin which derives from the given name Gruffudd. The prefix Griff (originally Gruff) may mean "strong grip" and the suffix, udd, means "chief"/"lord". The earliest recorded example of the surname was "Gryffyth" in 1295, but the given name is older. People with the surname or its variants include:

List of people surnamed Griffith

A–H
Alan Arnold Griffith, British engineer specializing in fracture mechanics and aircraft gas turbine engines
Anastasia Griffith, British actress
Andrew Griffith, (born 1971) British Conservative politician
Andy Griffith (1926–2012), American actor, writer and producer
Anthony Griffith, English-born Montserrat international football player
Arthur Griffith, Irish Republican leader
Bill Griffith, (born 1944), American cartoonist
Charles Griffith (disambiguation), various people
Clark Griffith, baseball player, manager, executive, and member of the Hall of Fame
Claudia Griffith (1950–2018), American politician
Corinne Griffith, silent film era actress and author
D. W. Griffith, American film director
Dan Griffith (born 1987), American DJ known as Gryffin
Edward Griffith (zoologist), British naturalist
Edward H. Griffith (1894–1975), American film director
Elisabeth Griffith, American historian, educator, and activist
Emile Griffith (1938–2013), U.S. Virgin Islands boxer
Eva Kinney Griffith (1852–1918), American journalist, temperance activist
Forrest Griffith (1928–2007), American football player
Francis Llewellyn Griffith (1862–1934), British Egyptologist
Frank Kingsley Griffith, British Liberal politician and judge
Frederick Griffith (disambiguation), multiple people
George Griffith, writer
Grace Griffith, American folk singer
Griffith J. Griffith, Welsh-American industrialist known for donating land for Griffith Park in Los Angeles
Harold Griffith (1894–1985), Canadian anaesthetist
Hugh Griffith, Welsh actor

J–Z
James Bray Griffith (1871–1937), American business theorist
Jamie Bamber, born Jamie St. John Bamber Griffith, British actor
Jason Griffith, American voice actor who is the former voice of Sonic the Hedgehog
John Griffith (disambiguation), multiple people
Jonas Griffith (born 1997), American football player
Justin Griffith, NFL fullback who currently plays for the Oakland Raiders
Kenneth Griffith, Welsh actor and documentary film maker
Laetitia Griffith (born 1965), Dutch politician
Lillian Griffith (1877–1972) Welsh artist and sculptor
 Manley Griffith, American actor better known as Griff Barnett
Mari Griffith, Welsh radio announcer and writer
Melanie Griffith (born 1957), American actress
Michael Griffith (disambiguation)
Morgan Griffith, American politician from Virginia
Nanci Griffith (1953–2021), American singer, guitarist and songwriter
Nicola Griffith, British author
Nathaniel Griffith Lerotholi, the fifth Paramount Chief of Lesotho
Peter Griffith (1933–2001), American actor
Phillip Griffith, mathematician
Ralph T. H. Griffith, Indologist
Ronald H. Griffith, former Vice Chief of Staff of the United States Army
Samuel Griffith, Australian politician and jurist who had a large part in composing the Constitution of Australia
Samuel B. Griffith, officer and commander in the United States Marine Corps
Thomas B. Griffith, American federal judge
Thomas Ian Griffith, American actor
Virgil Griffith, American hacker
Welborn Griffith, American soldier
William Griffith (1810–1845), British doctor, naturalist, and botanist
Xiomara Griffith, Venezuelan judoka

See also 
Griffith (name)
Griffiths
Griffin (surname)
Gruffudd

References

Surnames
English-language surnames
Surnames of Welsh origin
Anglicised Welsh-language surnames